Phyllophila is a genus of moths of the family Noctuidae. The genus was erected by Achille Guenée in 1852.

Species
 Phyllophila atripars Hampson, 1914
 Phyllophila atrisigna Dognin, 1914
 Phyllophila cogela Schaus, 1904
 Phyllophila corgatha Berio, 1984
 Phyllophila flavitermina Hampson, 1902
 Phyllophila griseola Felder & Rogenhofer, 1874
 Phyllophila melacheila Staudinger, 1895
 Phyllophila obliterata Rambur, 1833
 Phyllophila obscura Hampson, 1894
 Phyllophila richinii Berio, 1940
 Phyllophila rufescens Hampson, 1910
 Phyllophila torrefacta Distant, 1898
 Phyllophila yangtsea Draudt, 1950

References

Acontiinae